The 2006 Italian general election took place on 9–10 April 2006.

The election was won in Lombardy by the centre-right House of Freedoms coalition, differently from what happen at the national result. Eleven provinces gave a majority or a plurality to Silvio Berlusconi's alliance, while voters of the Province of Mantua supported the new Italian Prime Minister Romano Prodi.

Results

Chamber of Deputies

|-
|- bgcolor="#E9E9E9"
!rowspan="1" align="left" valign="top"|Coalition leader
!rowspan="1" align="center" valign="top"|votes
!rowspan="1" align="center" valign="top"|votes (%)
!rowspan="1" align="center" valign="top"|seats
!rowspan="1" align="left" valign="top"|Party
!rowspan="1" align="center" valign="top"|votes
!rowspan="1" align="center" valign="top"|votes (%)
!rowspan="1" align="center" valign="top"|seats
|-
!rowspan="5" align="left" valign="top"|Silvio Berlusconi
|rowspan="5" valign="top"|3,618,754
|rowspan="5" valign="top"|56.9
|rowspan="5" valign="top"|50

|align="left"|Forza Italia
|valign="top"|1,724,281
|valign="top"|27.1
|valign="top"|24
|-
|align="left"|Lega Nord
|valign="top"|745,035
|valign="top"|11.7
|valign="top"|11
|-
|align="left"|National Alliance
|valign="top"|647,560
|valign="top"|10.2
|valign="top"|9
|-
|align="left"|Union of Christian and Centre Democrats
|valign="top"|376,021
|valign="top"|5.9
|valign="top"|6
|-
|align="left"|Others
|valign="top"|125,857
|valign="top"|2.0
|valign="top"|-

|-
!rowspan="7" align="left" valign="top"|Romano Prodi
|rowspan="7" valign="top"|2,738,416
|rowspan="7" valign="top"|43.1
|rowspan="7" valign="top"|48

|align="left"|The Olive Tree
|valign="top"|1,698,099
|valign="top"|26.7
|valign="top"|33
|-
|align="left"|Communist Refoundation Party
|valign="top"|351,700
|valign="top"|5.5
|valign="top"|6
|-
|align="left"|Rose in the Fist
|valign="top"|146,986
|valign="top"|2.3
|valign="top"|2
|-
|align="left"|Federation of the Greens
|valign="top"|129,628
|valign="top"|2.0
|valign="top"|2
|-
|align="left"|Italy of Values
|valign="top"|124,976
|valign="top"|2.0
|valign="top"|2
|-
|align="left"|Party of Italian Communists
|valign="top"|111,904
|valign="top"|1.8
|valign="top"|2
|-
|align="left"|Others
|valign="top"|175,123
|valign="top"|2.8
|valign="top"|1

|-
!rowspan="1" align="left" valign="top"|Others
|rowspan="1" valign="top"|
|rowspan="1" valign="top"|
|rowspan="1" valign="top"|-

|align="left"|Others
|valign="top"|
|valign="top"|
|valign="top"|-

|-
|- bgcolor="#E9E9E9"
!rowspan="1" align="left" valign="top"|Total coalitions
!rowspan="1" align="right" valign="top"|6,539,170
!rowspan="1" align="right" valign="top"|100.0
!rowspan="1" align="right" valign="top"|98
!rowspan="1" align="left" valign="top"|Total parties
!rowspan="1" align="right" valign="top"|6,539,170
!rowspan="1" align="right" valign="top"|100.0
!rowspan="1" align="right" valign="top"|98
|}
Source: Ministry of the Interior

Senate

|-
|- bgcolor="#E9E9E9"
!rowspan="1" align="left" valign="top"|Coalition leader
!rowspan="1" align="center" valign="top"|votes
!rowspan="1" align="center" valign="top"|votes (%)
!rowspan="1" align="center" valign="top"|seats
!rowspan="1" align="left" valign="top"|Party
!rowspan="1" align="center" valign="top"|votes
!rowspan="1" align="center" valign="top"|votes (%)
!rowspan="1" align="center" valign="top"|seats
|-
!rowspan="5" align="left" valign="top"|Silvio Berlusconi
|rowspan="5" valign="top"|3,342,468
|rowspan="5" valign="top"|57.0
|rowspan="5" valign="top"|27

|align="left"|Forza Italia
|valign="top"|1,623,745
|valign="top"|27.7
|valign="top"|14
|-
|align="left"|Lega Nord
|valign="top"|652,047
|valign="top"|11.1
|valign="top"|5
|-
|align="left"|National Alliance
|valign="top"|572,242
|valign="top"|9.8
|valign="top"|5
|-
|align="left"|Union of Christian and Centre Democrats
|valign="top"|343,269
|valign="top"|5.9
|valign="top"|3
|-
|align="left"|Others
|valign="top"|151,165
|valign="top"|2.5
|valign="top"|-

|-
!rowspan="7" align="left" valign="top"|Romano Prodi
|rowspan="7" valign="top"|2,501,467
|rowspan="7" valign="top"|42.6
|rowspan="7" valign="top"|20

|align="left"|Democrats of the Left
|valign="top"|726,105
|valign="top"|12.4
|valign="top"|7
|-
|align="left"|Democracy is Freedom – The Daisy
|valign="top"|588,856
|valign="top"|10.0
|valign="top"|6
|-
|align="left"|Communist Refoundation Party
|valign="top"|407,939
|valign="top"|7.0
|valign="top"|4
|-
|align="left"|Together with the Union (Greens–PdCI)
|valign="top"|588,856
|valign="top"|4.8
|valign="top"|3
|-
|align="left"|Italy of Values
|valign="top"|150,116
|valign="top"|2.6
|valign="top"|-
|-
|align="left"|Rose in the Fist
|valign="top"|128,849
|valign="top"|2.2
|valign="top"|-
|-
|align="left"|Others
|valign="top"|220,050
|valign="top"|3.8
|valign="top"|-

|-
!rowspan="1" align="left" valign="top"|Others
|rowspan="1" valign="top"|25,193
|rowspan="1" valign="top"|0.4
|rowspan="1" valign="top"|-

|align="left"|Others
|valign="top"|25,193
|valign="top"|0.4
|valign="top"|-

|-
|- bgcolor="#E9E9E9"
!rowspan="1" align="left" valign="top"|Total coalitions
!rowspan="1" align="right" valign="top"|5,869,128
!rowspan="1" align="right" valign="top"|100.0
!rowspan="1" align="right" valign="top"|47
!rowspan="1" align="left" valign="top"|Total parties
!rowspan="1" align="right" valign="top"|5,869,128
!rowspan="1" align="right" valign="top"|100.0
!rowspan="1" align="right" valign="top"|47
|}
Source: Ministry of the Interior

Elections in Lombardy
2006 elections in Italy